The Nations Cup is a rugby union competition that was first held in 2006 at Estádio Universitário in Lisbon with Argentina A, Italy A, Portugal and Russia taking part. The tournament is part of the International Rugby Board's US $50 million Strategic Investment programme, which also includes the Pacific Nations Cup, the Pacific Rugby Cup and the Americas Rugby Championship (as well as the ARC's predecessor, the North America 4).

History
The Nations Cup is aimed at providing more competition for tier one A sides, as well as offering opportunities for second and third tier nations such as Portugal, Russia, Namibia, Uruguay, Georgia and Romania.  The Nations Cup is an important tournament for both Italy and Argentina; at the time of the inaugural competition in 2006, the two sides combined had only nine players that did not play in their respective domestic competitions. The inaugural tournament was won by Argentina A.

The Nations Cup was expanded in 2007, with six teams instead of four. Argentina A and Italy A returned, along with Namibia, Georgia, Romania and the Emerging Springboks. This was in part to allow Namibia, Georgia and Romania to warm up for the 2007 Rugby World Cup.  Originally scheduled to take place in the Tineretului Stadium, Bucharest, Romania, in the event the matches took place at the city's Stadionul Arcul de Triumf.  The Emerging Springboks were crowned champions and the Tournament has remained at Arcul de Triumf since then.

In 2008 Argentina A, soon to be rechristened as Argentina Jaguars, left the tournament to play in the Churchill Cup, Namibia also withdrew. Uruguay and Russia took their places. The Emerging Springboks were crowned champions for the second time with a 100% record.

2009 saw the addition of Scotland A and France A to the tournament at the expense of the Emerging Springboks and Georgia, which both had other commitments that year. The Emerging Springboks played the British & Irish Lions during the Lions' tour of South Africa, while Georgia accepted an invitation to the Churchill Cup. Scotland A won that year's edition.

For the 2010 edition, Romania and defending champions Scotland A returned from 2009, as did Italy A. France A, Russia, and Uruguay instead played in the 2010 Churchill Cup. Their places were taken by Georgia, returning after a one-year absence, and Namibia and Argentina Jaguars, returning for the first time since 2007. Namibia emerged as winners.

The 2011 edition effectively served as a 2011 Rugby World Cup warm-up for host Romania, defending Nations Cup champion Namibia, and Georgia. The Argentina Jaguars also returned from the 2010 edition. Portugal returned for the first time since the inaugural edition in 2006. South Africa made their first appearance since 2008 a successful one, with a team billed as the "South African Kings" — in reality, the Southern Kings, the country's planned future Super Rugby franchise — winning the event.

Southern Kings did not return to defend their title in 2012, nor did Namibia or Georgia return to take part.  Instead, Italy A (missing for a year) and Russia and Uruguay (missing for two years) reappeared.  For the first time in the competition's history, host nation Romania won.  They went on to retain the title in 2013, this time in a four-team round robin.

Emerging Ireland made their first appearance in the competition in 2014, along with Uruguay, Russia, and host Romania.  This edition is seen as important preparation for the 2015 Rugby World Cup.

In 2015, Namibia made their first appearance since 2011 as they began to prepare for the 2015 Rugby World Cup. They were joined by Spain who made their debut in the tournament, and the Argentina Jaguars, coached by Argentina's most capped and top point scorer Felipe Contepomi.

Teams
The teams that participated in the IRB Nations Cup and their finishing positions are as follows:

Statistics

Point scorers

<small>Last updated: 21 June 2015

Try scorers

<small>Last updated: 21 June 2015

Results
{| class="wikitable"
|-border=1 cellpadding=5 cellspacing=0
! bgcolor="#efefef" width="20"|Year
! bgcolor="#efefef" width="200"|Winner
! bgcolor="#efefef" width="90"|Host
|- 
| 2006 ||  || 
|-  
| 2007 ||  ||rowspan="10"|
|-  
| 2008 || 
|-  
| 2009 || 
|-
| 2010 || 
|-
| 2011 ||  South African Kings
|-
| 2012 || 
|-
| 2013 || 
|-
| 2014 ||  Emerging Ireland
|-
| 2015 || 
|-
| 2016 || 
|- 
| 2017 ||  ||rowspan="3"|
|- 
| 2018 || 
|- 
| 2019 || 
|}

See also 

 IRB Pacific Nations Cup
 IRB Tbilisi Cup
 Americas Rugby Championship
 Women's Nations Cup

References

External links
IRB Nations Cup Official site

 
Nations Cup